The Wuling Hongguang Mini EV is a battery electric city car manufactured by SAIC-GM-Wuling since 2020. Retail deliveries began in China in July 2020. , global sales since inception have passed 1,100,000 units, and the Mini EV has become the best-selling electric car in China.

Overview 

The Mini EV can seat four people, and standard features including air conditioning, power windows, stereo system, storage and compartments. Standard safety features of the Mini EV include anti-lock brakes, tire pressure monitoring sensors, and rear parking sensors. Early models did not include a driver airbag, but later models such as the Mini EV Macaron include the feature as standard.

Based on the NEDC driving cycle, the estimated energy consumption of the Mini EV is 8,1 kWh/100 km.

The car has attracted a cult following in China, with owners frequently modifying their vehicles. The popularity has been compared to that of kei cars in Japan. The vehicle has been such a success that it has inspired a number of copycats and competitors, including the Chery QQ Ice Cream, Dongfeng Fengguang MINI EV, and BAW S3.

Variants

Mini EV Macaron 
SAIC-GM-Wuling launched a variant of the regular Mini EV called the Mini EV Macaron in April 2021. The Macaron is a customized version that is available with three exclusive paint colors and more standard features. The Macaron is sold as a more premium and personalized variant that features redesigned darkened LED headlights, two-tone alloy wheels and exclusive body colors. The colors are Avocado Green, Lemon Yellow and White Peach Pink, which are the results of the collaboration of Wuling and Pantone Universe. The Macaron also receives more safety equipment compared to the previous base trim level, including low-speed pedestrian warning, a reversing camera with rear parking sonar and a driver-side airbag.

Mini EV Cabrio
A convertible concept version of the Mini EV called the Mini EV Cabrio with a folding soft top was unveiled during the 2021 Shanghai Auto Show, with the vehicle body design based on the Mini EV Macaron. The production version vehicle body design is based on Mini EV GameBoy Edition and was launched in September 2022.

Freze Nikrob 
In 2021 Lithuanian company Nikrob UAB announced a rebadged version of the Mini EV called the FreZe Nikrob with knock-down assembly in Vilnius, Lithuania.

Mini EV GameBoy Edition 
The Mini EV GameBoy Edition was introduced in March 2022.

Sales 
With six months in the market, the Mini EV sold 119,255 units in 2020, and ranked as China's and the world's second best selling plug-in car after the Tesla Model 3.

In January 2021, according to the China Passenger Car Association (CPCA), the Mini EV topped new energy vehicles sales with 25,778 units, compared to the Tesla Model 3 with 13,843 units sold in China.

The Mini EV listed as the world's top selling plug-in car in January 2021.

References

External links 

  
 Nikrob Freze Website  (EU Market)

Hongguang Mini EV
Cars introduced in 2020
Microcars
Hatchbacks
Convertibles
Electric city cars
Rear-wheel-drive vehicles
Cars of China
Production electric cars
Rear-engined vehicles